Ka'us III, was the fourth ruler of the Paduspanid branch of Kojur. He was the son and successor of Ashraf ibn Taj al-Dawla.

Biography
During his reign, relations with the Kia'id Khan Ahmad Khan flourished, and by 1514 family ties were between the Paduspanids and Kia'ids. Nine years later, Ka'us, along with the Marashiyan ruler visited the court of the Safavid king Ismail I. Not much more is known about Ka'us; he died after being poisoned by his son Kayumarth III, whom Ka'us had imprisoned for unknown reasons.

Sources

 
 

16th-century monarchs in Asia
16th-century Iranian people
1543 deaths
Baduspanids
Year of birth missing